Francis Browne was an English politician.

He was a Member (MP) of the Parliament of England for Bodmin in 1562 and 1563–1567.

References

Year of birth missing
Year of death missing
Members of the pre-1707 English Parliament for constituencies in Cornwall
Place of birth missing
English MPs 1563–1567